This is a list of songs that topped the Belgian Walloon (francophone) Ultratop 40 in 1997.

See also
1997 in music

References

External links
 Ultratop 40

1997 in Belgium
1997 record charts
1997